Jo Hye-joo (born April 18, 1995) is a South Korean actress and model. She began her acting career with the 2017 film Wedding. She is best known for her roles in Search: WWW (2019) and the coming of age television series A Love So Beautiful (2020).

Early life
Hye-joo was born on April 18, 1995 in South Korea. She graduated from Chung-Ang University.

Career

2017–present: Modelling and acting debut
Jo made her debut as a model under YG Entertainment and YG KPlus. She made her acting film debut in  Wedding in 2017. She was cast as the lead in the web series Just Too Bored as Bae Ye-seul in 2018. She also had a cameo appearance in A-Teen. She played her second lead role in Just One Bite and Just One Bite 2. 

She made a special appearance in Big Issue and in He Is Psychometric and the film Miss & Mrs. Cops. Her popularity rose after starring in the romance melodrama Search: WWW. Jo was starred in Kim Na-young's "To Be Honest" music video, which was released on June 9, 2019. She made a cameo in the film The Man Standing Next followed by the television series Memorist as Yoo Seung-ho's sister.

It was announced that Jo will play the role of Kang Ha-yeong in A Love So Beautiful alongside Kim Yo-han, So Joo-yeon and Yeo Hoe-hyun. The drama is a coming-of-age drama based on the 2017 Chinese series of the same name, aired on Tencent Video, which is based on novel To Our Pure Little Beauty by Zhao Qianqian.

Filmography

Film

Television series

Music video appearances

References

External links
 
 Jo Hye-joo at YG KPlus 

1995 births
Living people
21st-century South Korean actresses
Chung-Ang University alumni
South Korean female models
South Korean film actresses
South Korean television actresses
South Korean television personalities
South Korean web series actresses